Pachydermia sculpta is a species of sea snail, a marine gastropod mollusk in the family Peltospiridae.

Description
The length of the shell attains 2.8 mm.

Distribution
This marine species was found in the North Fiji Basin at a depth of 2000 m.

References

 Warén, A. & Bouchet, P. (1993). New records, species, genera, and a new family of gastropods from hydrothermal vents and hydrocarbon seeps. Zoologica Scripta. 22: 1-90.

External links
 Warén A. & Bouchet P. (2001). Gastropoda and Monoplacophora from hydrothermal vents and seeps new taxa and records. The Veliger, 44(2): 116-231

Neomphalidae
Gastropods described in 1993